Amanda Jacqueline Sater, Baroness Sater {born 21 June 1963) is a British marketing executive and magistrate. Sater has sat on several charitable boards.

Sater's professional career was spent in marketing and she has been a director of the Institute of Sales Promotion.

Sater was nominated for a life peerage by Theresa May in May 2018. On 20 June, she was created Baroness Sater, of Kensington in the Royal Borough of Kensington and Chelsea.

Sater has served on the boards of several organisations including Addaction, the British Lung Foundation, the Youth Justice Board, and the Metropolitan Police Authority. Satar has served as chair of the charity StreetGames and the Queen's Club Foundation. In her youth Sater was a Welsh county and national tennis player and took part on the junior tennis tour. She is currently president of  Tennis Wales.

Sater has served as a magistrate and has sat for 16 years on the Inner London Youth Bench.

References

External links
Affiliate Management In Ecommerce

Living people
British charity and campaign group workers
British marketing people
Conservative Party (UK) life peers
Life peeresses created by Elizabeth II
English justices of the peace
Welsh tennis players
1963 births